The 1967 Illinois Fighting Illini football team was an American football team that represented the University of Illinois during the 1967 Big Ten Conference football season. In their first year under head coach Jim Valek, the Illini compiled a 4–6 record and finished in a tie for fifth place in the Big Ten Conference.

The team's offensive leaders were quarterback Dean Volkman with 1,005 passing yards, running back Rich Johnson with 768 rushing yards, and wide receiver John Wright with 698 receiving yards. Wright was selected as the team's most valuable player.

Schedule

This was the first season since 1952 in which Illinois faced Iowa, following the chaos of their last matchup.

References

Illinois
Illinois Fighting Illini football seasons
Illinois Fighting Illini football